The 1985 Gent–Wevelgem was the 47th edition of the Gent–Wevelgem cycle race and was held on 10 April 1985. The race started in Ghent and finished in Wevelgem. The race was won by Eric Vanderaerden of the Panasonic team.

General classification

References

Gent–Wevelgem
1985 in road cycling
1985 in Belgian sport
1985 Super Prestige Pernod International